Charles Henry Burke (April 1, 1861 – April 7, 1944) was a Republican Congressman from South Dakota and Commissioner of the Bureau of Indian Affairs in the 1920s.

Biography
He was born near Batavia, New York, in 1861, and attended the public school there.  He moved to the Dakota Territory in 1882 and settled on a homestead in Beadle County of what is now South Dakota, moving on to Hughes County in 1883.

He studied law and was admitted to the bar in 1886.  He also engaged in the real estate investment business in the area of Pierre, South Dakota.  He was elected to the South Dakota House of Representatives in 1895 and 1897.  He ran for the United States House of Representatives in 1898, won election, and remained in that position through 1907, losing the nomination for the 1906 election, although he won again in 1908 and remained in the House through 1915, serving as Minority whip from 1913 through 1915.  In 1914, he received the nomination for the United States Senate seat from South Dakota and chose not to run for reelection to the House.  He lost that Senate race.

He was appointed Commissioner of Indian Affairs in 1921 and served in that capacity until his resignation in 1929.  He died in 1944, in Washington, D. C.

Burke and Native Americans

In 1934 Congress approved the Wheeler-Howard Bill (Indian Reorganization Act) hailed by its advocates as the Indian Magna Carta.
Its adoption marked the climax of a bitter contest waged throughout the 1920s between Indian protectors and reformers—led by John Collier and Gertrude Bonnin—and obscurantists and exploiters of Indians—led by Albert B. Fall and Charles H. Burke. The reformers had been able to reduce some of the power of the exploiters, which centered in an insensitive Congress and an uncaring bureaucracy, during the 1920s wringing from a reluctant national administration a few modest improvements in Native American welfare. Then in 1934, they won their signal victory through passage of the Indian Reorganization Act, their cause riding on the momentum of the New Deal commitment to transform the nation.

During the early 1920s, Secretary of the Interior Albert B. Fall was principal spokesman for the obscurantist element. The former senator from New Mexico was a staunch advocate of the business community's unhindered access to mineral and petroleum resources on reservations. Fall choice for Commissioner of Indian Affairs was Charles H. Burke, former congressman from South Dakota and author of the Burke Act which chilled Native American citizenship hopes and emasculated the trust features of allotment in severalty by making access to restricted allotments a matter of administrative discretion. The New York Times described Burke as a "rugged individualist" with a "frontiersman’s" attitude toward Indians.

Hubert Work, Fall's successor in 1923, was as honest as Fall was corrupt but just as ethnocentric. Along with Christian missionaries he sought to stamp out Indian culture, particularly native religion and the peyote cult. He bent to reformers’ demands only after they applied great pressure upon him.

Fall, Burke, and Work had strong support from the Indian bureau which at the time had over 200 employees in Washington and 5,000 field workers (teachers, vocational instructors, and general agents), a high ratio of personnel to the 250,000 Indians living on reservations. The move for reform of Indian policy threatened their jobs, and they closed ranks behind their administrative superiors.

More and more, public opinion was formed by mass-circulation national periodicals and newspapers. Shrewd obscurantists resorted to magazine and newspaper interviews to justify their positions. The Saturday Evening Post, School Life, and Good Housekeeping regularly carried articles antagonistic to the emerging Indian reform movement. In addition, the obscurantists were backed by several church publications including the Missionary Review, which carried articles written by missionaries working among the Indian tribes. They called Indians "pagan worshippers in desperate need of Christianity" and described the difficult task they faced in attempting to overthrow native religion and the peyote cult.

Obscurantists were particularly concerned with Indian dances which they thought showed Indian recalcitrance, defiance, and ethnic corruption. Those who defended ethnic pluralism and the Indians right to worship as they chose, including dancing, were denounced as "anti-American, and subversive... agents of Moscow." It was charged that they encouraged the persistence of "Indian paganism" and heathen cults which were "horrible, sadistic, and obscene." Further, they were accused of attempting to weaken and discredit the United States's government. Edith M. Dabb, national director of YWCA work among Indian girls, joined the Native American detractors, charging that native dances were a waste of time and that "sentimentalists who dwell on the beauties of the quaint and primitive world do well to remember that primitive beauty is frequently found in close company with primitive cruelty and primitive ugliness."

During an inspection of New Mexico pueblos in 1926 Commissioner Burke publicly excoriated the residents as "half animals" because of "their pagan religion," and he ordered several Indian leaders jailed "for violating the Bureau’s religious crimes code."

Legacy
The town of Burke, South Dakota, was named for the congressman.

References

External links

 

1861 births
1944 deaths
Politicians from Washington, D.C.
Republican Party members of the South Dakota House of Representatives
People from Pierre, South Dakota
Republican Party members of the United States House of Representatives from South Dakota